If All I Was Was Black is the thirteenth studio album by American R&B, soul and gospel singer Mavis Staples. It was released on November 17, 2017, by ANTI- Records. The album was written and produced by Jeff Tweedy.

Background
The album's announced on September 11, 2017. The album consists of 11 songs, all of which were written by Jeff Tweedy. Staples said she hoped the album will "bring us all together as a people. That's what I hope to do. You can't stop me. You can't break me. I'm too loving. These songs are going to change the world." Tweedy described the message of the album, saying, "I’ve always thought of art as a political statement in and of itself—that it was enough to be on the side of creation and not destruction. But there is something that feels complicit at this moment in time about not facing what is happening in this country head on."

Release and promotion
The lead single, "If All I Was Was Black", was released on September 11, 2017, along with the album's pre-order. "Little Bit" was released as the second single from the album on October 12, 2017. The third single, "Build a Bridge", was released on November 7, 2017. "Ain't No Doubt About It" was released as the fourth and final single on November 14, 2017. A music video for "If All I Was Was Black" was released on February 12, 2018.

Critical reception

If All I Was Was Black received generally favorable reviews upon release. At Metacritic, which assigns a normalized rating out of 100 to reviews from mainstream publications, the album received an average score of 80, based on 18 reviews.

Track listing

Personnel
Adapted from the album liner notes.
Mavis Staples - vocals
Jeff Tweedy -  guitar, bass, percussion, vocals
Spencer Tweedy - drums, percussion
Rick Holmstrom - guitar
Jeff Turmes - bass
Stephen Hodges - drums, percussion
Donny Gerrard - backing vocals
Kelly Hogan - backing vocals
Akenya - backing vocals
Glenn Kotche - percussion
Scott Ligon - clavinet, piano, organ, Wurly, guitar

Charts

References

2017 albums
Mavis Staples albums
Anti- (record label) albums
Albums produced by Jeff Tweedy